Power is a 1996 Canadian documentary film directed by Magnus Isacsson. The film portrays the efforts of the Cree and Inuit of Nord-du-Québec to campaign against the hydroelectricity project on the Great Whale River.

The film premiered in the Perspective Canada program at the 1996 Toronto International Film Festival.

The film received a Genie Award nomination for Best Feature Length Documentary at the 17th Genie Awards.

References

External links
 

1996 films
1996 documentary films
1990s Canadian films
1990s English-language films
Canadian documentary films
Documentary films about First Nations
English-language Canadian films
Films scored by Mark Korven